Yousuf Raza Gillani Flyover is located in Multan city of Pakistan. Ground breaking of this flyover was done by former prime minister of Pakistan Yousuf Raza Gillani on the new year ceremony on Saturday, 31 December 2011. It was built at a cost of around Rs.1.6 billion rupees. It is the part of Inner Ring Road Multan project.
It is a four lane flyover with partitions. Two one ways of two lanes each. Length of the flyover is 1.6 km (excluding length of extra three ramps). There are three extra ramps connecting to the main flyover.

Records
It is largest flyover in Punjab province of Pakistan. It is also third largest flyover of Pakistan.

Ramps
 Two main ramps.
 One extra entry ramp from Aziz Hotel Chowk.
 One extra exit ramp towards Aziz Hotel Chowk.
 One extra exit ramp for Vihari Road.

It starts from Bomanji Chowk and overpasses multiple traffic points and railway lines namely
 Aziz Hotel Chowk
 Railway lines at Multan Cantonment Railway Station
 Chowk Double Phatak

It will connect to the M-4 Motorway via Old Shujabad road, once the motorway section will be completed

See also
 Chowk Kumharanwala Level II Flyover, Multan
 Pul Moj Darya Flyover, Multan
 Nishtar Chowk Flyover, Multan
 Sher Shah Interchange Flyovers, Multan
 List of flyovers in Multan
 List of flyovers in Pakistan
 List of flyovers in Lahore

References

 Ground Breaking of Yousuf Raza Gillani Flyover Multan
 Cost and Length of Flyover
 Inauguration of Yousuf Raza Gillani Flyover on Saturday, 31 December 2011
 Pakistan PM now has a flyover in his name

External links
 Multan City government website
 Portal of Multan City

Transport in Multan
Buildings and structures in Multan